Gigi Fernández and Natasha Zvereva successfully defended their title, defeating Larisa Neiland and Jana Novotná in the final, 6–4, 6–7(4–7), 6–4 to win the ladies' doubles tennis title at the 1993 Wimbledon Championships.

Seeds

  Gigi Fernández /  Natasha Zvereva (champions)
  Larisa Neiland /  Jana Novotná (final)
  Arantxa Sánchez Vicario /  Helena Suková (quarterfinals)
  Lori McNeil /  Rennae Stubbs (quarterfinals)
  Mary Joe Fernández /  Zina Garrison-Jackson (semifinals)
  Pam Shriver /  Elizabeth Smylie (semifinals)
  Jennifer Capriati /  Steffi Graf (withdrew)
  Jill Hetherington /  Kathy Rinaldi (quarterfinals)
  Katrina Adams /  Manon Bollegraf (first round)
  Amanda Coetzer /  Inés Gorrochategui (first round)
  Magdalena Maleeva /  Manuela Maleeva-Fragnière (third round)
  Patty Fendick /  Meredith McGrath (second round)
  Sandra Cecchini /  Patricia Tarabini (withdrew)
  Eugenia Maniokova /  Leila Meskhi (second round)
  Debbie Graham /  Brenda Schultz (first round)
  Isabelle Demongeot /  Elna Reinach (first round)
  Sandy Collins /  Robin White (second round)
  Florencia Labat /  Radka Zrubáková (first round)

Qualifying

Draw

Finals

Top half

Section 1

Section 2

Bottom half

Section 3

Section 4

References

External links

1993 Wimbledon Championships on WTAtennis.com
1993 Wimbledon Championships – Women's draws and results at the International Tennis Federation

Women's Doubles
Wimbledon Championship by year – Women's doubles
Wimbledon Championships